Ludovic Valbon (born 22 May 1976, in Neuilly-sur-Seine) is a French rugby union footballer. He currently plays for CA Brive in the Top 14 championship. His usual position is as a centre or on the wing.

He has previous played for CA Bordeaux-Bègles Gironde until he moved to Brive. He made his Test debut for France in 2004 against the US Eagles. He was also included in France's mid-year Test squad for 2007 in the two game series against the All Blacks in New Zealand.

External links
 lequipe profile
 itsrugby.fr profile
 2rugby profile

1976 births
Living people
Sportspeople from Neuilly-sur-Seine
French rugby union players
Rugby union centres
Rugby union wings
France international rugby union players
CA Brive players
CA Bordeaux-Bègles Gironde players
Racing 92 players